Primulina dryas, called the oak-nymph-leaved primulina, is a species of flowering plant in the genus Primulina, native to southeast China. It has gained the Royal Horticultural Society's Award of Garden Merit.

References

dryas
Endemic flora of China
Plants described in 2011